Lipke is a surname. Notable people with the surname include:

 Adolph Lipke (1915–1984), South African cricketer
 Jānis Lipke (1900–1987), Latvian rescuer of Jews in Riga during World War II
 Lipke Holthuis (1921–2008), Dutch carcinologist
 Paul Lipke (1870–1955), German chess master

Lipke is also the former German name of what is now Lipki Wielkie, in Gorzów County, Lubusz Voivodeship, western Poland.

See also